Yuelu may refer to:

Yuelu District, a district in Changsha, Hunan, China.
Yuelu Academy, an educational institute of China
Yuelu Mountain, a mountain in Hunan.
Yuelü, the name for 22/7 (an approximation of the mathematical constant π) used by Zu Chongzhi